Funda Eryiğit (born 6 November 1984) is a Turkish actress.

Early life 
She is of Turkish, Circassian, and Georgian descents. After graduating from Kadir Has Anatolian High School, she graduated from Istanbul University State Conservatory Theater Department after completing the International Relations Department of Istanbul University Political Sciences Faculty.

Career 
She won the Best Actress award in the musical / comedy category at the 18th Sadri Alışık Theater and Cinema Player Awards due to her performance in Sessizlik at Istanbul State Theater's 2012–2013 season. She has also been nominated for the Best Actress award at the 17th Afife Theater Awards.

She was first recognised for her role in popular series Canım Ailem. She was cast in comedy series İstanbul'un Altınları and crime series Uçurum. With Buğra Gülsoy, Uraz Kaygılaroğlu, she had leading role in series Eski Hikaye. She became international popular  after playing the role of Esra in Gecenin Kraliçesi. She joined in the popular series "Karadayı", "Poyraz Karayel".

Filmography

References 

1984 births
Turkish television actresses
Turkish film actresses
Living people
Istanbul University alumni
Turkish people of Circassian descent
Turkish people of Georgian descent